The Southern California PGA Championship is a golf tournament that is the championship of the Southern California section of the PGA of America. The Southern California section was formed in 1924, and the tournament was first played that year.  It has been held at various venues in Southern California on an annual basis since that time.  The tournament has been won more than 25 times by players who also have victories on the PGA Tour.

Winners 

 2022 Michael Block
 2021 Kyle Mendoza
 2020 Kyle Mendoza
 2019 Jeff Hart
 2018 Michael Block
 2017 Michael Block
 2016 Kenny Pigman
 2015 Chad Sorensen
 2014 Ryan Kennedy
 2013 Alan Scheer
 2012 Chris Starkjohann
 2011 Mike Miles
 2010 Chris Starkjohann
 2009 Ron Skayhan
 2008 Mike Miles
 2007 Erik Wolf
 2006 Ross Marcano
 2005 Scott Miller
 2004 Chris Starkjohann
 2003 Geoffrey Dean
 2002 Paul Dietsche
 2001 Monty Leong
 2000 Jeff Cranford
 1999 Jeff Freeman
 1998 Jeff Freeman
 1997 Ken Conant
 1996 Kelly Manos
 1995 Dan Bateman
 1994 Brad Sherfy
 1993 Jerry Wisz
 1992 Jeff Fairfield
 1991 Chris Starkjohann
 1990 Scott Mahlberg
 1989 Scott Bentley
 1988 Shawn McEntee
 1987 Scott Chaffin
 1986 Dave Barber
 1985 Jim Woodward
 1984 Paul Wise
 1983 Paul Wise
 1982 Curtis Sifford
 1981 R. H. Sikes
 1980 Curtis Sifford
 1979 Chuck Montalbano
 1978 Dave Barber
 1977 Dennie Meyer
 1976 Tommy Jacobs
 1975 Jimmy Powell
 1974 Paul McGuire
 1973 Rafe Botts
 1972 Tommy Jacobs
 1971 Tommy Jacobs
 1970 Jimmy Powell
 1969 Jerry Steelsmith
 1968 Jimmy Powell
 1967 Mac Hunter
 1966 Bob McCallister
 1965 Ronnie Reif
 1964 Wayne Sleepy
 1963 Eric Monti
 1962 Emil Scodeller
 1961 No tournament
 1960 Bud Holscher
 1959 Jerry Barber
 1958 Johnny Bulla
 1957 Eric Monti
 1956 Eric Monti
 1955 Jim Ferrier
 1954 Ralph Evans
 1953 Eric Monti
 1952 Eric Monti
 1951 Ellsworth Vines
 1950 Fay Coleman
 1949 Zell Eaton
 1948 Harry Bassler
 1947 Paul Runyan
 1946 Fay Coleman
 1945 Dale Andreason
 1944 Clayton Alridge
 1943 Marvin Stahl
 1942 Willie Hunter
 1941 Bud Oakley
 1940 Olin Dutra
 1939 Willie Hunter
 1938 Olin Dutra
 1937 Stanley Kertes
 1936 Stanley Kertes
 1935 Eric Seaval
 1934 Lew Scott
 1933 Olin Dutra
 1932 Olin Dutra
 1931 Olin Dutra
 1930 Olin Dutra
 1929 Charlie Guest
 1928 Ed Dudley
 1927 Charlie Guest
 1926 Charlie Guest
 1925 George Kerrigan
 1924 Dick Linares

References

External links 
PGA of America – Southern California section
Southern California PGA Championship: Past Champions

Golf in California
PGA of America sectional tournaments
Recurring sporting events established in 1924